Temple Christian School is a private K-12 Christian school in Mansfield, Ohio, United States.

Athletics 
The Temple Christian Crusaders are independent of an athletic league.  They compete in the following sports:

The soccer field is located at 998 Beal Rd. in Mansfield.

External links
 Temple Christian School homepage

References 

Christian schools in Ohio
Buildings and structures in Mansfield, Ohio
Education in Richland County, Ohio
High schools in Richland County, Ohio